John M. Smith may refer to:

John M. Smith (politician, born 1872), American businessman and politician.
 John M. C. Smith (1853–1923), American politician
 John Manners Smith (1864–1920), Chief Commissioner of Ajmer-Merwara
 Frederick Smith (Conservative MP) (John Mark Frederick Smith, 1790–1874), British Army general and politician
 John Maynard Smith (1920–2004), British biologist
 John McGarvie Smith (1844–1918), Australian metallurgist
 John Montgomery Smith (1834–1903), American politician
 John M. Smith (bishop) (1935–2019), American Roman Catholic prelate
 John Moyr Smith (1839–1912), British artist

See also
 John Smith (disambiguation)
 Smith (disambiguation)